The 1987 Tour de Suisse was the 51st edition of the Tour de Suisse cycle race and was held from 16 June to 25 June 1987. The race started in Affoltern am Albis and finished in Zürich. The race was won by Andrew Hampsten of the 7-Eleven team.

Teams
In total, fourteen teams of up to nine riders, plus eight independent riders started the race.

General classification

Stages

Prologue
Affoltern am Albis, 8.5 km ITT

 Werner Stutz in 11'21"
 Andrew Hampsten at 2"
 Guido Winterberg at 7"
 Tony Rominger at 9"
 Eric Pedersen at 10"
 Dag-Otto Lauritzen
 Stephan Joho at 11"
 Alan Peiper at 14"
 Acácio da Silva
 Marco Giovannetti at 15"

Stage 1
Affoltern am Albis-Rugell/Lie, 170 km

 Adriano Baffi in 4h31'15"
 Alan Peiper
 Raúl Alcalá at 2"
 Marc Sergeant at 11"
 Gert-Jan Theunisse
 Jean-Claude Leclercq
 Hans Daams at 30"
 Peter Stevenhaagen
 Max Hürzeler
 Davis Phinney

Stage 2
Rugell/Bendern-Leibstadt, 178.5 km

 Steven Rooks in 4h39'16"
 Acácio da Silva
 Marc Sergeant at 14"
 Marco Vitali
 Erich Maechler
 Andreas Kappes
 Heinz Imboden
 Alan Peiper at 1'05"
 Andrew Hampsten
 Daniel Gisiger at 1'23"

Stage 3
Leibstadt-Basel, 141.5 km

 Johan van der Velde in 3h48'59"
 Teun van Vliet
 Adriano Baffi at 7"
 Marc Sergeant
 Erik Pedersen
 Christophe Lavainne
 Jean-Claude Leclercq
 Stefano Colage
 Steven Rooks
 Acácio da Silva

Stage 4
Basel/Birsfelden, 25 km ITT

 Dietrich Thurau in 30'59"
 Tony Rominger at 7"
 Erich Maechler at 14"
 Alan Peiper at 27"
 Stephan Joho at 51"
 Gerard Veldscholten at 56"
 Andrew Hampsten at 57"
 Guido Winterberg at 58"
 Eric Vanderaerden at 1'01"
 Steven Rooks

Stage 5
Basel-Brügg bei Biel, 129.5 km

 Teun van Vliet in 3h19'59"
 Ron Kiefel
 Bruno Leali
 Gert-Jan Theunisse
 Guido Winterberg at 3"
 Walter Magagno at 19"
 Stephen Hodge
 Valerio Piva at 50"
 Marco Bergamo at 1'01"
 Markus Eberli

Stage 6
Brügg bei Biel-Täsch, 265.5 km

 Marco Giovannetti in 6h52'58"
 Fabio Parra at 20"
 Jonas Tegstroem at 1'19"
 Stephen Hodge at 1'45"
 Claudio Vandelli
 Andreas Kappes at 1'48"
 Erich Maechler
 Enrico Pocchini at 1'54"
 Johan Van de Velde
 Stephan Mutter

Stage 7
Täsch-Cademario, 211.5 km

 Peter Winnen in 5h16'20"
 Fabio Parra at 20"
 Alessandro Paganessi
 Johan van der Velde at 1'29"
 Charly Mottet at 1'57"
 Rafael Acevedo at 2'11"
 Andrew Hampsten at 2'12"
 Acácio da Silva at 2'21"
 Bernard Gavillet at 2'24"
 Marco Giovannetti at 2'29"

Stage 8
Cademario/Agno-Scuol, 253.5 km

 Roy Knickmann in 7h08'51"
 Jeff Pierce at 44"
 Rocco Cattaneo at 48"
 John Baldi
 Daniel Gisiger at 1'33"
 Claudio Vandelli
 Giancarlo Perini
 Valerio Piva
 Antonio Ferretti
 Dietrich Thurau

Stage 9
Scuol-Laax, 145.5 km

 Alessandro Paganessi in 3h48'18"
 Jan Nevens at 12"
 Heinz Imboden at 1'23"
 Peter Winnen at 1'31"
 Alfio Vandi at 1'38"
 Fabio Parra
 Andrew Hampsten
 Jörg Pedersen at 1'42"
 Acácio da Silva at 1'52"
 Hubert Seiz

Stage 10
Laax-Zürich, 170 km

 Urs Freuler in 3h48'29"
 Andreas Kappes
 Adriano Baffi
 Stephan Joho
 Max Hurzeler
 Marc Sergeant
 Jörg Müller
 Daniel Gisiger
 Pius Schwarzentruber
 Peter Winnen

References

1987
Tour de Suisse
1987 Super Prestige Pernod International